Michelle Stilwell (nee Bauknecht; born July 4, 1974) is a Canadian wheelchair racer and politician. She is the only female Paralympic athlete to win gold medals in two separate summer sport events. Stilwell was elected to the Legislative Assembly of British Columbia as a BC Liberal candidate for Parksville-Qualicum in the 2013 provincial election. She represented Canada at the 2000 Summer Paralympics, 2008 Summer Paralympics, and 2012 Summer Paralympics.

Early life and education
Stilwell was born on July 4, 1974, in Winnipeg, Manitoba, Canada. While attending River East Collegiate, she broke her neck from a fall and became an incomplete quadriplegic. After the accident, she competed in wheelchair basketball, through which she met her husband Mark at the 1996 National Championships in Montreal. Stilwell eventually moved to Calgary where she completed her Bachelor of Science degree at the University of Calgary in 1999.

Paralympic career

Stilwell stayed in Calgary from 1997 until 2000 to train for the Canada women's national wheelchair basketball team. She competed as a reserve for Team Canada at the 2000 Paralympic Games, where her team won a gold medal. Afterwards, Stilwell, her husband Mark, and their newborn son moved to Vancouver Island.

However, Stilwell was forced to forgo wheelchair basketball after undergoing surgery for a herniated brain stem. Although was unable to compete at a national level, Stilwell continued to play basketball locally where she was spotted by Coach Peter Lawless, who convinced her to try for wheelchair racing. Stilwell qualified for the 2008 Paralympic Games where she won two gold medals in the woman's T52 200m and 100m events. This was followed by three gold medals (with World Championship records) and one silver at the 2011 World Championships in Christchurch, New Zealand.

At the London 2012 Paralympic Games, Stilwell defended her Paralympic gold medal in the women's 200m in 33.80 seconds, shattering her Games record by over two seconds. Four days later, Stilwell captured a silver medal in the 100m after mishap caused her to fall behind Marieke Vervoort. The following year, she competed in the 2013 IPC Athletics World Championships and set a new world record in the women's T52 class 800 metres.

In 2016, her last Paralympic Games, Stilwell earned a gold medal while also setting a Paralympics record during the T52 wheelchair 400 metres race, with a time of one minute and 5.42 seconds. The following year, Stilwell announced her retirement from competitive sports and was inducted into the BC Sports Hall of Fame.

Stilwell was inducted into the Manitoba Sports Hall of Fame in 2019.

Political career
In 2013, Stilwell campaigned to become the BC Liberal candidate for Parksville-Qualicum in the 2013 provincial election. She was elected to the Legislative Assembly of British Columbia and served as Caucus Chair and Parliamentary Secretary  for Healthy Living and Seniors for two years before being sworn in as Minister for Social Development and Social Innovation.

Stillwell was re-elected in 2017, but lost her seat in the 2020 election.

Electoral record

References

External links

 
 
 Michelle Stilwell - Cœur Handisport
 Official Liberal Party Website
 Official Wheelchair Racing Website

1974 births
Living people
Wheelchair basketball players at the 2000 Summer Paralympics
Athletes (track and field) at the 2008 Summer Paralympics
Athletes (track and field) at the 2012 Summer Paralympics
Athletes (track and field) at the 2016 Summer Paralympics
British Columbia Liberal Party MLAs
Canadian politicians with disabilities
Canadian sportsperson-politicians
Canadian female wheelchair racers
Women government ministers of Canada
Medalists at the 2000 Summer Paralympics
Medalists at the 2008 Summer Paralympics
Medalists at the 2012 Summer Paralympics
Medalists at the 2016 Summer Paralympics
Members of the Executive Council of British Columbia
Olympic wheelchair racers of Canada
Paralympic gold medalists for Canada
People from Parksville, British Columbia
Politicians from Winnipeg
Athletes from Winnipeg
Women MLAs in British Columbia
World record holders in Paralympic athletics
Paralympic silver medalists for Canada
21st-century Canadian politicians
21st-century Canadian women politicians
Paralympic medalists in athletics (track and field)
Paralympic track and field athletes of Canada
Paralympic medalists in wheelchair basketball
People with tetraplegia
Medalists at the 2015 Parapan American Games